Rodman Clark Rockefeller (May 2, 1932 – May 14, 2000) was an American businessman and philanthropist. He was a son of former U.S. Vice President Nelson Aldrich Rockefeller as well as a grandson of American financer John D. Rockefeller Jr. and a great-grandson of Standard Oil co-founder John D. Rockefeller.

Early life
Rockefeller was born on May 2, 1932, in Manhattan, New York. He was the eldest son of former U.S. Vice President Nelson Aldrich Rockefeller (1908–1979) and his wife Mary Todhunter "Tod" Clark (1908–1999) and was a fourth-generation member of the Rockefeller family.

Rockefeller attended Deerfield Academy, then his father's alma mater, Dartmouth College. At Dartmouth, he was a member of Green Key, co-edited Dartmouth's Freshman Handbook, and was elected to Phi Beta Kappa, as had been his grandfather, John D. Rockefeller Jr. 

Rockefeller later earned a master's degree from Columbia University's Graduate School of Business Administration.

Career
Rockefeller was vice president from 1968 to 1972 and chief executive from 1972 to 1980 of the International Basic Economy Corporation, a commercial genetics and agribusiness concern based in New York and incorporated by his father in 1946. Its activities, all in Latin America, included developing corn production there and building thousands of low-cost homes in three places in Mexico. He was also chairman of IBEC Inc. a successor concern, from 1980 to 1985, and of Arbor Acres Farm, based in Glastonbury, Connecticut, a seller of genetic material for poultry broiler stock, for some years.

Rockefeller was co-chairman of the Mexico-United States Business Committee, an organization focusing on economic and political issues of interest to both nations' business communities. The passage of the North American Free Trade Agreement in the mid-1990s has been called the culmination of his and the committee's efforts. The honors he received included a prestigious Mexican decoration, the Order of the Aztec Eagle.

He was on the board of the Rockefeller Brothers Fund for nine years. For many years, he was a trustee of Rockefeller Financial Services, which manages the family's office (known as "Room 5600"), its investment companies and its many foundations.  He was the head of the finance committee of Rockefeller Financial Services for many years and was a longtime trustee of Rockefeller Financial's holding company, Rockefeller & Company.

Rockefeller served as chairman of Pocantico Associates, a private capital and real estate investment company. He was also a trustee of the Institute of International Education, the Thomas Jefferson Memorial Foundation, the Museum of Modern Art, the Americas Society, and New York Blood Center.

Personal life
Rockefeller married Barbara Ann Olsen in 1953 and the couple had four children: Meile, Peter, Stuart, and Michael. That marriage ended in divorce in 1979 and he married the former Alexandra von Metzler, known as Sascha, in 1980. His son, Peter C. Rockefeller, is married to Allison Whipple Rockefeller.

Rockefeller died at his home on the East Side of Manhattan on May 14, 2000.

References

Rockefeller family
Winthrop family
American philanthropists
Deerfield Academy alumni
1932 births
2000 deaths
Children of vice presidents of the United States
Columbia Business School alumni
Dartmouth College alumni
Clark banking family
American people of English descent
American people of German descent
20th-century American businesspeople